Rinbung is a township and seat of Rinbung County in the Shigatse Prefecture of the Tibet Autonomous Region of China.

See also
List of towns and villages in Tibet

Populated places in Shigatse
Rinbung County
Township-level divisions of Tibet